An Jae-jun (born 8 February 1986) is a South Korean football centre-back, who plays for Army United.

Club career statistics

External links

1986 births
Living people
Association football defenders
South Korean footballers
Incheon United FC players
Jeonnam Dragons players
Ansan Mugunghwa FC players
Seongnam FC players
Daejeon Hana Citizen FC players
An Jae-jun
K League 1 players
K League 2 players